Vishwa Bandhu Gupta, popularly known as Vishwa Bandhu, is an Indian social activist and prominent leader since the 2011 Indian anti-corruption movement. He is a former Indian Revenue Service officer, who served in the Income Tax Department and was suspended as an Additional Commissioner.

The name Vishwabandhu is derived from Hindu Late Maharana Pratap Singh

Vocal opponent of the VDIS scheme 
When the Deputy Director or Additional Commissioner of Income Tax asked the Vishwa Hindu Parishad to furnish its income tax returns for 1989–90, the notice was squashed and although the Income tax department asked the VHP to submit details, the Central Government did not investigate the case and he was transferred  to Madras and then he was suspended.
In 2000, Gupta also spoke against corruption in cricket and made an allegation on unnamed former Indian Cricket Captain to have declared ₹160 Million in the Voluntary Disclosure of Income Scheme (VDIS) in 1997. He suspected abuse of the VDIS by criminals.

References

Indian Revenue Service officers
Freedom of information activists
Indian anti-corruption activists
Indian whistleblowers
1950 births
Living people
Indian balloonists